The National Deaf Federation Nepal (NDFN; (ne)) is a non-governmental organization established and run as the umbrella organization for Nepal's various district and local deaf associations. Previously it was known as the National Federation of the Deaf and Hearing (NFDH). It is a member of the World Federation of the Deaf (WFD) and works as an advocate for deaf rights, as well as running a number of programs throughout the country to improve the lives of Nepal's deaf population.

Two of the core areas in which it works are sign language and deaf education. It has worked on publishing a "Dictionary of Nepali Sign Language", and continues to collect and create signs for supplements to this dictionary. It also has trained and sent deaf sign language instructors to teach Nepali Sign Language to deaf who otherwise have no exposure to sign language. In the area of deaf education, it works closely with the Ministry of Education, the Department of Education, the Curriculum Development Center, and the various deaf schools, to improve the quality of deaf education in Nepal.

Currently, local member Deaf associations include:

References

External links
 NDFN homepage

Deafness organizations
Deaf culture in Nepal
Year of establishment missing
Disability organisations based in Nepal